Feather Your Nest is a 1937 British musical comedy film directed by William Beaudine and starring George Formby, Polly Ward and Enid Stamp-Taylor.

Plot
A worker at a gramophone record factory surprisingly creates a hit song, "Leaning on a Lamp-post".

Cast
 George Formby - Willie Piper
 Polly Ward - Mary Taylor
 Enid Stamp-Taylor - Daphne Randall
 Val Rosing - Rex Randall
 Davy Burnaby - Sir Martin
 Jack Barty - Mr Chester
 Clifford Heatherley - Randall's valet
 Frederick Burtwell - Murgatroyd
 Ethel Coleridge - Mrs Taylor
 Jimmy Godden - Mr Higgins
 Moore Marriott - Mr Jenkins
 Syd Crossley - Police Constable
 Frank Perfitt - Studio manager
 Frederick Piper - Green
 Mike Johnson as Charlie 
 Leonard Sharp as Mr. Peabody 
 Harry Terry as Furniture Thief  
 Hal Walters as Man Outside Furniture Shop 
 Edie Martin as Blanche

Critical reception
Halliwell's Film Guide observed "the star in less farcical vein than usual" 
TV Guide concluded, "not one of Formby's best films, but mildly enjoyable, nonetheless".

Bibliography
 Low, Rachael. Filmmaking in 1930s Britain. George Allen & Unwin, 1985.
 Perry, George. Forever Ealing. Pavilion Books, 1994.
 Wood, Linda. British Films, 1927-1939. British Film Institute, 1986.

External links

 Feather Your Nest at GeorgeFormby.co.uk

References

1937 films
British musical comedy films
1937 musical comedy films
1930s English-language films
Films directed by William Beaudine
Associated Talking Pictures
British black-and-white films
1930s British films